Julian Shakespeare Carr (October 12, 1845 – April 29, 1924) was an American industrialist, philanthropist, and white supremacist. He is the namesake of the town of Carrboro, North Carolina.

Early life 
Carr was the son of Chapel Hill merchant and slaveowner John Wesley Carr and Eliza P. Carr (née Eliza Pannell Bullock). Carr was from a prominent North Carolinian planting family and was a cousin of Governor Elias Carr and of Mary Hilliard Hinton.

He entered the University of North Carolina (today the University of North Carolina at Chapel Hill) at the age of sixteen, in 1862.

His studies were interrupted in 1864 by service as a private in the Confederacy, serving with the Third North Carolina Cavalry.

Career 
After the war, Carr became a partner in the tobacco manufacturing firm W. T. Blackwell and Co. in nearby Durham. His business acumen led to the firm's becoming known worldwide through its recognizable Bull Durham trademark. Carr became one of the state's wealthiest individuals, engaging in successful textile, banking (Durham's First National Bank), railroad, public utility (Electric Lighting Company), and newspaper endeavors.

In 1909, Carr purchased the Alberta Cotton Mill from Thomas F. Lloyd in what was then called West End, North Carolina, by Chapel Hill. In 1913, after agreeing to extend electricity to the town, it was named Carrboro in honor of him. In the 1970s, the mill, abandoned for many years, was restored and opened as Carr Mill Mall.

Politics

National
Carr was nominated for Vice President of the United States by delegates from North Carolina (and one from Montana) at the 1900 Democratic National Convention, at which he gave a speech. He served as a delegate himself to the 1912 convention.

Bolstering white supremacy in North Carolina
Julian Carr also played an essential role in bolstering white supremacy in North Carolina during the era of Jim Crow. He publicly endorsed the Ku Klux Klan, opposed the 15th Amendment (1870) giving the vote to African-American men, and promoted racial unrest and turmoil in the late 19th century to defeat an interracial "Fusion" political party. Carr promoted his racial views through the News & Observer newspaper, which he bought, setting up white supremacist Josephus Daniels as its Editor. He celebrated the Wilmington Massacre of 1898, in which an elected government was overthrown by force (the only such incident in American history), and where at least 60 black North Carolinians were murdered. In numerous speeches, he suggested that African Americans were better off enslaved and celebrated violence, even lynching, against black citizens.

In 1880 he was nominated for Lieutenant Governor. Carr was an unsuccessful candidate in the 1900 Democratic primary for senator, running on a platform of white supremacy.

Carr was the largest single donor to the Silent Sam monument to Confederate alumni on the UNC-Chapel Hill campus. At its dedication in 1913, Carr addressed the crowd, urging vigorous support for white supremacy. He bragged of an incident when he was 19 years old, "less than ninety days perhaps after my return from Appomattox", in which he performed the "pleasing duty" of horse-whipping an African-American "wench" "until her skirts hung in shreds", because he said she had "publicly insulted and maligned a Southern lady". This passage received a great deal of attention starting in 2011, after it was rediscovered in the university archives by a graduate student in history (Adam Domby) and published in the campus newspaper, the Daily Tar Heel. It contributed significantly to the discontent that culminated in the toppling of the statue August 20, 2018.

Philanthropy
Carr was also instrumental in the founding of Duke University (where the history building on East Campus was named after him from 1930 to 2018). As Trinity College struggled to overcome postwar dependency on uncertain student tuition and church donations, interested Methodist laymen were crucial to its survival. Carr's name first appears in college records signing a note to forestall foreclosure on a mortgage due in 1880. Carr was elected a trustee of Trinity College in 1883, and over the course of the decade acted as benefactor and administrator of the struggling institution that was eventually renamed Duke University. He engineered the selection of John F. Crowell as the institution's new president, and along with Washington Duke won support to remove the school from its rural setting in Randolph County, North Carolina to Durham.

Carr was noted in Volume VI of The History of Woman Suffrage for his encouragement of the formation of the Equal Suffrage League of North Carolina: "At this time, when it was far from popular to stand for this cause, Judge Walter Clark, Chief Justice of the Supreme Court; Gen. Julian S. Carr, Archibald Henderson, Wade Harris and E.K. Graham acted as an Advisory Committee and gave freely of their time and money to help the League."

A long-time advocate for the welfare of Confederate veterans, the "high-private," as he liked to refer to himself, was Commander-in-Chief of North Carolina's United Confederate Veterans. At the 1913 dedication of the Confederate Monument (later known as Silent Sam) on the campus of the University of North Carolina at Chapel Hill, Carr gave a speech wherein he credited the Confederate soldiers of having "saved the very life of the Anglo Saxon race in the South," and as a consequence, "the purest strain of the Anglo Saxon is to be found in the 13 Southern States," after which he ended his speech by relating a personal anecdote when he was 19 years old of having soon after the war "horse-whipped a negro wench until her skirts hung in shreds" in Chapel Hill for having "publicly insulted and maligned a Southern lady," and having performed this "pleasing duty" in front of a garrison of 100 Federal soldiers after she sought protection at the university.

General Jule, as he was known, served as the representative for the Methodist Episcopal Church South to the United States Food Administration during World War I.

Carr was instrumental in the Western education of Charles Soong and the financing of Soong's Shanghai Bible-publishing business, who later was active in Sun Yat-Sen's attempts to establish a modern republic in China. Though it is largely forgotten today, Carr was a major financial backer of the Chinese Revolution.

Legacy
 The city of Carrboro, North Carolina.
 Carr Hall, at the University of North Carolina at Chapel Hill. Carr paid the entire cost of this building, erected in 1900 as a dormitory. When new it was described as "one of the stateliest buildings on its [UNC-CH] beautiful campus", but in 2017 it was "a decrepit administrative office building". The building was renamed in 2020.
 "Duke University's Carr Building is a different story. Its original name, in 1927, was "Classroom Building". It was renamed "Carr Building" in 1930. In 2018 the original name of Classroom Building was restored (see below).
 A building at the Durham School of the Arts, originally Central Junior High School, was named for Carr. On August 24, 2017, in addition to prohibiting the Confederate flag, the Board of the Durham Public Schools voted unanimously to remove Carr's name from the building.
 The Durham chapter of the  United Daughters of the Confederacy is named the Julian S. Carr Chapter.
 In 1945, the 100th anniversary of his birth, Governor R. Gregg Cherry proclaimed October 12, 1945, as Julian S. Carr Day in North Carolina. On that day, an editorial in the Durham Sun said that "Named for him are a great many things, churches, a factory, a library, a Sunday School class, a host of children whose parents admired the man, and, now, Durham's Central Junior High School."
A portrait of him hangs in the house of the UNC System President

Personal life
He married Nannie Graham Parrish, daughter of Colonel D.C. Parrish, in 1873. They had four sons and two daughters. Their main residence, Somerset Villa, was "an ornament to Durham". The Carrs owned a secondary residence, a plantation in Hillsborough called Poplar Hill.

Later in life, he was known as "General Carr," the unofficial rank having been bestowed by the state veterans' association due to his long service in veterans' affairs and generosity toward widows and their children. In 1923, UNC bestowed an honorary degree upon Julian Carr. 

Julian Carr died at his daughter's home in Chicago on April 29, 1924.

Conflicting assessments
Carr supported white supremacy and the Ku Klux Klan, spoke favorably of the murder of African Americans that occurred during the Wilmington Massacre of 1898, which he called a "grand and glorious event", and celebrated lynchings.

As early as 1889 Carr had been described as "the foremost man in North Carolina", his name "a household word". When running for Senator in 1900, an editorial said that "with a large purse. a liberal heart and a ready hand, he has contributed more to the educational and charitable institutions of North Carolina than any other man in the state."  At the centennial of his birth in 1945, President of the North Carolina College for Negroes (today's North Carolina Central University) James E. Shepard was quoted as having said that "I have never known the first time for him to fail to give to any enterprise which he thought would benefit the colored people or to lend his influence in their behalf… He put his time and money into the effort to establish that institution, and no call upon him was ever made in vain. I have known scores and scores of colored people who were the recipients of his kindness and generosity. I, too, was a recipient of the same. I never knew a cause, as stated above, to be in vain. I have never known a colored person too poor or ignorant who went to General Carr for assistance who did not receive the same."

In 1962, Durham mayor W. F. Carr (a nephew) described him as "a philanthropist without stint, a soldier without fear, a churchman without apology, a citizen without self-interest, a leader without tyranny, a follower humble enough to follow good leaders." He added that "he contributed liberally of his wealth to churches, schools, and universities, including the stately Methodist church on Chapel Hill Street, and the Trinity Methodist Church in up-town Durham; Trinity College (Duke since 1934), Davidson, Wake Forest, Saint Mary's, Elon, Greensboro College and the North Carolina College for Negroes." He was chairman of the Board of Trustees of the latter, today North Carolina Central University.

In 1999, University of North Carolina alumnus Sam Shaefer opined in the Raleigh News & Observer that

Carr ... over the course of his life vigorously promoted and fought for some of the worst causes in human history – racial chattel slavery, racial segregation and white supremacy, and the restriction of political power to a small class of wealthy people. In our present, when we are faced with the enormity of the consequences of the ideology of racism, the monstrosity of unfettered capitalism, and active threats to the realistically very weak institutions of democracy that we hold on to, the idea of venerating Carr is the worst kind of apologia.

During the dispute about that University's Silent Sam confederate monument, Peter Coclanis, Albert R. Newsome Distinguished Professor of History at UNC-Chapel Hill, and William Sturkey, Assistant Professor of History at UNC-Chapel Hill, disagreed in a series of op-ed pieces in the Herald-Sun. Coclanis opined that "Carr, alas, was an ex-Confederate, and a man of his times, whose personal 'allusion' during a 1913 address in Chapel Hill—uttered when he was 67 years old—has made him a reviled figure among many people today. This is unfortunate and somewhat unfair in my view, however one feels about Silent Sam.... People are more than the worst thing they have done in their lives."

Sturkey responded that

Coclanis ... inaccurately portrays Carr as an otherwise generous philanthropist, unfairly vilified over a single bad moment or poor choice of words.  * * *  Julian Carr’s broader body of work indicates a long career of vile and violent white supremacism.... In the broader view, Carr’s life was filled with abhorrent activities and rhetoric that are not only deplorable today, but were illegal and belligerent in his own time. Carr committed treason against the United States of America, advocated the murder and disfranchisement of African Americans, and helped lead a racially divisive and violent political campaign that shattered democracy in North Carolina for over 60 years. Julian Carr was not merely 'a man of his times,' but rather an architect of his times. He was an enemy of enlightenment and democracy whose rhetoric and actions, both then and now, cast dark shadows over the civil and political life of the state and retard our ability to move forward from the legacies of slavery and Jim Crow.

In the final piece, Coclanis wrote

I do not disagree with Sturkey's contention that Carr was a white supremacist and thus racist by our standards. That said, I fail to understand his larger point.  The vast majority of white southerners – indeed, white Americans – during the period in which Carr lived were white supremacists and racists by our standards. The vast majority did not, however, make pioneering innovations in business, did not bring about profound changes in the economy, and did not provide opportunities for generations of people (some of whom were African-American) to raise their living standards. Carr was exceptionally philanthropic to numerous causes and institutions....  History is tragedy, not melodrama, and all of us have feet of clay. Martin Luther, especially in his later writings, was clearly anti-Semitic; Martin Luther King Jr. was a notorious philanderer and a plagiarist to boot. George Washington was a slave-owner; Abraham Lincoln was by our standards racist and white supremacist. Do they deserve to be disappeared too?  Pace Mr. Sturkey, the answer is no. These men were four of the greatest beings in our history. Though hardly in their league, Julian Carr, on balance, was a force for good and deserves honorable remembrance too.

Removal of Carr's name
"'Carr-washing' has become a popular trend in Durham and Chapel Hill, as Julian Carr's name is taken off buildings, such as the Durham Performing Arts Center. His self-presentation, at the dedication of the Confederate Monument (Silent Sam) as proud to use violence to maintain white supremacy, has sparked a movement. The speech has been quoted at Black Lives Matter Movements, and secondhand sources say it was referenced at the University of Virginia march. Carr's slave count is undocumented other than those who labored for his companies, but his White Supremacist ties are undeniable."
 The Durham Board of Education voted to remove Julian Carr's name from a building (the former Central Junior High School, mentioned above) at the Durham School of the Arts and to adopt a new dress code specifically prohibiting items that "intimidate other students on the basis of race." Mentioned were the Confederate flag, the Nazi swastika, and Ku Klux Klan symbols.
 The Duke University History Department, after the toppling of Silent Sam and the attention it gave to Carr's words, asked that Carr Hall, which houses the department, be renamed. Duke President Vincent Price called for a formation of a committee of students and faculty to examine options for a new understanding of Carr, his white supremacy, and his early support for Duke University. The committee held three meetings and sought comments from the Duke community, the "vast majority" of which favored renaming. On December 1, 2018, on the recommendation of the committee, the Board of Trustees voted to remove Carr's name from the building and temporarily returned the Hall to its original name, "Classroom Building", until a new name is decided upon.

 A petition has circulated calling for the town name of Carrboro to be changed. According to Alderwoman Jacquie Gist, "Changing Carrboro's name is not a realistic option", but the town of Carrboro is planning to erect a plaque "acknowledging namesake Julian Carr's racist remarks".

 In July 2020, the University of North Carolina at Chapel Hill's Carr Hall was renamed the "Student Affairs Building."

References

Further reading

External links
Julian Shakespeare Carr Papers at Wilson Special Collections Library of the University of North Carolina at Chapel Hill.

1845 births
1924 deaths
American bankers
American chief executives of manufacturing companies
American city founders
American manufacturing businesspeople
American philanthropists
American tobacco industry executives
Duke University people
North Carolina Democrats
People from Chapel Hill, North Carolina
Businesspeople from Durham, North Carolina
People of North Carolina in the American Civil War
University of North Carolina at Chapel Hill alumni
American suffragists
History of racism in North Carolina
Wilmington insurrection of 1898
North Carolina culture
American proslavery activists
Confederate States Army soldiers
American slave owners
American white supremacists
Julian
19th-century far-right politicians in the United States
20th-century far-right politicians in the United States
Chapel Hill-Carrboro, North Carolina
White American culture in North Carolina